

Butler is a locality in the Australian state of South Australia located on the Eyre Peninsula about  west of the state capital of Adelaide and about  north of the local government seat of Tumby Bay.

Its name and boundaries were both adopted and created in 1998.  Its name is reported as being collectively derived from the Butler Tanks, a water storage facility, and the Butler Railway Station which are both located within Butler, and from the cadastral unit of the Hundred of Butler in which it is located.  The name is ultimately derived from Richard Butler, a South Australian politician.

A school operated within the current boundaries of the locality from 1905 to 1968.

The route of the Cummins to Buckleboo branch of the Eyre Peninsula Railway passes through the locality from the south-west to the north-east and includes two railway station sites - Butler and Mount Hill.

The principal land use with the locality is agriculture.  In 2006, land within the locality was the subject of an exploration license with the name ‘Mount Hill’ held by Eyre Iron Pty Ltd for the purpose of prospecting for iron ore deposits.

Butler is located within the federal division of Grey, the state electoral district of Flinders and the local government area of the District Council of Tumby Bay.

See also
Butler (disambiguation)
Mount Hill, South Australia

References
Notes

Citations

Towns in South Australia
Eyre Peninsula